Anthidium cordiforme is a diurnal species of winged bee in the family Megachilidae, known as the leafcutting bees. They were first classified by Friese in 1922. The bee is bilaterally symmetric from head to tail, and is holometabolous (undergoes complete metamorphosis, including a pupal stage).

Distribution

 Southern Africa including:
 Botswana
 Mozambique
 Namibia
 South Africa
 Zimbabwe

Synonyms
Synonyms for this species include:
Anthidium severini maculiferum Cockerell, 1936
Anthidium cordiforme makarikaricum Mavromoustakis, 1936

References

cordiforme
Insects described in 1922